The Falkland Islands official football team is a representative football team of the Falkland Islands, organised by the Falkland Islands Football League. The Falkland Islands Football League does not belong to the CONMEBOL, as its member countries support Argentina in the sovereignty conflict, and therefore neither can it be a member of FIFA. Thus, the team is not eligible to play in official competitions such as the World Cup and the Copa América. The team has played in the Island Games in 2001, 2005, 2009, 2011, 2013, 2015 and 2017. In 2013 the team enjoyed a record win and a 3rd place medal.

After two years with no League football it was decided that the Falkland Islands Football League (FIFL) would be completely revamped, a Constitution was drawn up and Committee members were put forward and accepted.  After the Constitution was passed by interested players, a new league was organised with four teams, with players being picked by each of the team's captains. On 9 November the opening league fixtures were played.

At the same time, the Falkland Islands National team appointed manager Jimmy Curtis to lead the team at the 2009 Island Games in Åland.  A squad of over 23 players was picked and training began in September 2008. The long distance needed to travel, the expensive cost to travel on RAF and LAN flights and the need to take between 16–18 players usually prevents the Football team from attending the Island Games more often than every four years.  Due to the remoteness of the islands and the small population, the Stanley team can only play military teams or visiting warships.

The Falkland Islands football team most recently competed at the NatWest Island Games in 2017, held between 24 and 30 June in Gotland. This was the seventh time the Falkland Islands have competed in the Island Games. They were drawn in Group D with the Isle of Man, Ynys Môn and Hitra. After losing all 3 group matches they played Alderney in the 15th place play off, losing 3–0.

List of matches played

Tournament records

Island Games

Current squad
The following players have been called up for the 2017 Island Games which took place in Gotland from 24 to 30 June 2017. Caps correct as of 18 July 2013.

|-
! colspan="9"  style="background:#b0d3fb; text-align:left;"|
|- style="background:#dfedfd;"

|-
! colspan="9"  style="background:#b0d3fb; text-align:left;"|
|- style="background:#dfedfd;"

|-
! colspan="9"  style="background:#b0d3fb; text-align:left;"|
|- style="background:#dfedfd;"

References

External links
Fedefútbol profile 
List of matches in Roon Ba
Stadium profile at Worldstadia
CSANF Website
The Remotest Football Website

 
Football in the Falkland Islands
South American national association football teams